Knowing Bros, also known as Men on a Mission or Ask Us Anything, is a South Korean variety show, produced by SM C&C and distributed by JTBC every Saturday. This show is classified as a reality television-variety show, where the cast members and guests gather in a classroom environment and discuss personal topics and further play various games.

Knowing Bros first aired on December 5, 2015. , 373 episodes of Knowing Bros have been aired.

Series overview

2015
In the table below, the blue numbers represent the lowest ratings and the red numbers represent the highest ratings.

2016
In the table below, the blue numbers represent the lowest ratings and the red numbers represent the highest ratings.

2017 
In the table below, the blue numbers represent the lowest ratings and the red numbers represent the highest ratings.

2018 
In the table below, the blue numbers represent the lowest ratings and the red numbers represent the highest ratings.

2019 
In the table below, the blue numbers represent the lowest ratings and the red numbers represent the highest ratings.

2020 
In the table below, the blue numbers represent the lowest ratings and the red numbers represent the highest ratings.

2021 
In the table below, the blue numbers represent the lowest ratings and the red numbers represent the highest ratings.

2022 
In the table below, the blue numbers represent the lowest ratings and the red numbers represent the highest ratings.

2023 
In the table below, the blue numbers represent the lowest ratings and the red numbers represent the highest ratings.

Cancellation of broadcasting

See also
 List of Knowing Bros special series

References

External links
  

Episodes
Lists of variety television series episodes
Lists of South Korean television series episodes